Michael Carbajal (born September 17, 1967) is an American five-time world boxing champion of Mexican descent. His nickname was "Little Hands Of Stone," after his favorite boxer,"Hands Of Stone" Roberto Durán.

Amateur career
Carbajal had an amateur record of 94-9 and won a silver medal as a light flyweight at 1988 Seoul Olympics in South Korea.

Highlights
 1986 National Golden Gloves Light Flyweight champion
 1987 – Carbajal won the silver medal at the 1987 Pan American Games
 1988 – United States amateur Light Flyweight champion

1988 Olympic Results
Below are the results of Michael Carbajal, an American light flyweight boxer who competed at the 1988 Seoul Olympics:

 Round of 32: Defeated Kwang-Soo Oh (South Korea) points (3:2 decision)
 Round of 16: Defeated Dang Hieu Hien (Vietnam) points
 Quarterfinal: Defeated Scotty Olson (Canada) points
 Semifinal: Defeated Robert Isaszegi (Hungary) points
 Final: Lost to Ivailo Marinov (Bulgaria) points (0:5 decision)
There were suspicions of politics influencing the judges in Carbajal's decision loss in the gold medal bout.

Professional career
Seven months after the Olympics, in February 1989, Carbajal made his debut in front of a national television audience as part of the card where Duran became a four-time world champion by beating Iran Barkley in Atlantic City. In his first fight, Carbajal outboxed another future world champion, Will Grigsby.

Carbajal followed that win with a spectacular first-round knockout of Silviano Perez on NBC. In his tenth bout, he met Pedro Feliciano, handling him a ten-round beating. Four more wins followed, and Carbajal was presented with an opportunity to fight for a world championship.

IBF light flyweight title
On July 29, 1990, Carbajal faced Muangchai Kittikasem, who came to Phoenix from Thailand to defend his IBF light flyweight championship. Carbajal methodically took apart the champion in front of an ABC national audience.  In round 7, after a combination of punches left Kittikasem lying defenseless against the ropes, the referee stepped in and stopped the fight, making Carbajal the world champion for the first time in his career.

Carbajal began a string of twelve victories over the next two and a half years, including six title defenses against challengers such as Leon Salazar, Hector Patri, Kim Kwang-Sun and Robinson Cuesta, and a win over future champion Jesus Chong in a non-title fight.

Unification against Humberto "Chiquita" Gonzalez
He then fought a highly anticipated unification match with WBC champion Humberto González  on March 13, 1993. Carbajal and Gonzalez became the first Junior Flyweights in history to earn a million dollar purse, and it was the first Junior Flyweight "superfight" and championship bout to headline a Pay Per View event.

Carbajal was downed in rounds 2 and 5, and he was bleeding from his right eyebrow when he blasted a tremendous left hand to the side of Gonzalez's chin in the seventh round. Gonzalez turned sideways, and Carbajal landed another right hand that sent him to the canvas. Gonzalez could not beat the count, and Michael Carbajal had unified the world's Junior Flyweight championship in The Ring's fight of the year. He would also be named fighter of the year for 1993.

Many television endorsement deals followed, including printed and television ads for Diet Pepsi and Emergency Chiropractic, but trouble seemed to follow, as well.  He was accused of firing gunshots onto the roof of a party in Scottsdale.

This unwanted attention seemed to take its toll on Carbajal, and after two additional defenses, he fought Gonzalez once again in a pay-per-view match in Los Angeles, California.  In his 11th world title fight, Carbajal suffered the first loss of his career as he was defeated by a controversial 12 round split decision.

WBO light flyweight title
Carbajal next took on former sparring partner Abner Barajas, winning by a fifth-round knockout in Laughlin, Nevada, and then was given another shot at a world title by the WBO title holder Josue Camacho, who came from Puerto Rico to the challenger's hometown to defend his title. Carbajal put on a brilliant performance and won a unanimous twelve-round decision over Camacho.

A title holder again, Carbajal set to try to recover his International Boxing Federation and WBC belts against Gonzalez in a third unification bout between the boxers.  In November 1994, three months after the Camacho victory, they met once again, this time in Mexico City. Once again, it was a split decision, and once again, Carbajal came out on the losing end. He wouldn't give up, however, and he kept training under the guidance of his brother, Danny Carbajal, the only man ever to train Michael.

IBF light flyweight title
He put another string of seven wins together, against the likes of former world champion Jose Quirino, whom he stopped in one round, and tough Mauro Salas, who lasted seven. Then he met two-time world champion Melchor Cob Castro in Las Vegas for the vacant International Boxing Federation Junior Flyweight title. Carbajal beat Castro by unanimous decision to claim his fourth world title.

His third title reign lasted 22 months and three defenses, including an eighth-round knockout of tough two-time challenger Tomas Rivera, before he lost his crown again. On January 18, 1997, Carbajal suddenly looked aged and was unable to do anything against the charges of Colombian Mauricio Pastrana. Carbajal still made the fight close, but lost a twelve-round split decision.

After that, Carbajal met Canada's Scotty Olson in San Antonio, Texas. Carbajal showed he had more left than Olson did, and dominated the fight until a spectacular right hand sent Olson down for the count in round 11.

The win over Olson gave Carbajal a minor title, but in July 1997 in Las Vegas once again, he was defeated by South Africa's Jacob Matlala. Matlala handed Carbajal his first inside the distance defeat ever, stopping the past-his-prime former world champion in round nine via cuts. Carbajal did not fight for 19 months after this defeat.

Second comeback, WBO title win, and retirement
Carbajal announced a comeback early in 1999. He won three bouts, including a tko victory over former champion José de Jesús, and on July 31, 1999, he took the short flight from Phoenix to Tijuana to challenge WBO world Junior Flyweight champion Jorge Arce, who was fighting in his hometown. Arce dominated Carbajal for nine of the first ten rounds, but Carbajal floored the 21-year-old Arce in the sixth round. The fight moved along, and in the 11th round, Carbajal struck Arce with a right hand that sent him into the ropes. The referee stopped the fight, and Michael Carbajal was a world champion for the fifth time.

After this fight, Carbajal retired as a world champ. Carbajal is trying to live a quieter life nowadays in Phoenix, but he does many public appearances. He enjoys meeting his public and signing autographs for his fans. Carbajal also owns two boxing gyms in Phoenix.

Michael Carbajal and former rival Humberto González were elected together to the International Boxing Hall of Fame in 2006.

His career record was 49 wins against four losses, with 33 wins coming by way of knockout.

Professional boxing record

See also
List of light-flyweight boxing champions

References

External links
 
Michael Carbajal - CBZ Profile

|-

|-

1967 births
Living people
Olympic boxers of the United States
Boxers at the 1987 Pan American Games
Boxers at the 1988 Summer Olympics
Sportspeople from Phoenix, Arizona
Light-flyweight boxers
World light-flyweight boxing champions
International Boxing Federation champions
World Boxing Council champions
World Boxing Organization champions
International Boxing Hall of Fame inductees
American boxers of Mexican descent
Winners of the United States Championship for amateur boxers
Boxers from Arizona
American male boxers
Medalists at the 1988 Summer Olympics
Pan American Games silver medalists for the United States
Olympic silver medalists for the United States in boxing
Pan American Games medalists in boxing
Medalists at the 1987 Pan American Games